Acrobleps is a genus of Australian araneomorph spiders in the family Anapidae, containing the single species, Acrobleps hygrophilus. It was  first described by V. V. Hickman in 1979, and has only been found in Australia.

References

Anapidae
Monotypic Araneomorphae genera
Spiders of Australia